Trachydora leucobathra is a moth in the family Cosmopterigidae. It is found in Australia, where it has been recorded from Queensland.

References
Notes

Sources
Natural History Museum Lepidoptera generic names catalog

Trachydora
Moths of Australia